Corythucha coryli, the hazelnut lace bug, is a species of lace bug in the family Tingidae. It is found in North America.

References

Further reading

 
 

Tingidae
Articles created by Qbugbot
Insects described in 1917